Riccardo Cassano (27 June 1885 - 16 November 1953) was an Italian film director. He directed in more than ten films from 1915 to 1946.

Selected filmography

References

External links 

1885 births
1953 deaths
Italian film directors